George Thorogood and the Destroyers is the self-titled debut album by American blues rock band George Thorogood and the Destroyers, released in 1977. Consisting mostly of covers of blues hits, it includes a medley of John Lee Hooker's "House Rent Boogie" and "One Bourbon, One Scotch, One Beer", the latter a song written by Rudy Toombs for Amos Milburn, and later covered by Hooker.

In 2015 Rounder released George Thorogood and the Delaware Destroyers, a new remix of the album featuring the three-piece band as originally recorded and mixed. It omits the bass overdubs by Billy Blough, which were added after the original recording sessions. It also adds the previously unreleased Elmore James track "Goodbye Baby".

Track listing
The track listing of the original release is as follows:
"You Got to Lose" (Earl Hooker) – 3:15
"Madison Blues" (Elmore James) – 4:24
"One Bourbon, One Scotch, One Beer" (John Lee Hooker) – 8:20
"Kind Hearted Woman" (Robert Johnson) – 4:21
"Can't Stop Lovin'" (E. James) – 3:04
"Ride On Josephine" (Ellas McDaniel) – 4:17
"Homesick Boy" (George Thorogood) – 3:02
"John Hardy" (Traditional) – 3:18
"I'll Change My Style" (William Parker, Manuel Villa) – 3:57
"Delaware Slide" (Thorogood) – 7:45

Additional track on the 2015 remix only:
'Goodbye Baby' (E. James) - 3:27

Personnel

Musicians
George Thorogood – vocals, guitar, harmonica
Ron Smith – guitar
Billy Blough – bass guitar
Jeff Simon – drums

Technical
Ken Irwin – producer
John Nagy – engineer
Susan Marsh – design
Henry Horenstein – photography (front cover)
Sam Clover – photography (back cover)

Charts

Certifications and sales

References

1977 debut albums
George Thorogood and the Destroyers albums
Rounder Records albums